Malto may refer to:
The Malto language, a Dravidian language of India
The Malto people, an ethnic group of India
malto-, a prefix referring to maltose
 Malto Brewery, an Albanian company
 Sean Malto (born 1989), American skateboarder

Language and nationality disambiguation pages